Georgiana Slough, is a slough within Sacramento County, California. It is located in the Sacramento–San Joaquin River Delta, and links both the Sacramento River and the San Joaquin River above their confluence in the Delta near Pittsburg, at the head of Suisun Bay, through its connection with the Mokelumne River.

History
Georgiana Slough was first used by steamboats in the 19th century as a shortcut between Sacramento and Stockton.  It is named after the Georgiana, the first steamboat to use the route in April 1850.,

References

Sacramento–San Joaquin River Delta
Mokelumne River
San Joaquin River
Sacramento River
Geography of the Sacramento Valley